Travisville is an unincorporated community in Harrison Township, Wells County, in the U.S. state of Indiana.

History
Travisville was named after John Travis, who laid out the community.

A post office called Travis was established in 1873, and remained in operation until it was discontinued in 1877.

Geography

References

Unincorporated communities in Wells County, Indiana
Unincorporated communities in Indiana